Abocciputa is a genus of flies belonging to the family Hybotidae.

The species of this genus are found in New Zealand.

Species:
 Abocciputa pilosa Plant, 1989

References

Hybotidae
Empidoidea genera